Der rote Rausch is a 1962 West German thriller film directed by Wolfgang Schleif and starring Klaus Kinski.

Cast
 Klaus Kinski as Martin
 Brigitte Grothum as Katrin
 Marina Petrova as Anna
 Sieghardt Rupp as Karl
 Dieter Borsche as Professor Lindner
 Jochen Brockmann as Vollbricht
 Hans Obonya as Klobner
 Elisabeth Terval as Theres
 Annemarie Berthe as Professor Lindners Assistantin
 Edd Stavjanik as Kriminalrat Berger
 Peter Machac as Franz
 Christine Ratej as Hanni
 Helmuth Silbergasser as Stephan
 Renate Schmidt as Verkäuferin
 Josef Krastel as Ladenbesitzer
 Herbert Fux as Lastwagenfahrer
 Walter Regelsberger as Verkehrspolizist

External links

1962 films
1960s thriller films
German thriller films
West German films
1960s German-language films
Films directed by Wolfgang Schleif
German black-and-white films
Films based on German novels
1960s German films